Bistritz may refer to:

Municipalities
The city of Bistrița, the capital city of Bistriţa-Năsăud County, Transylvania, Romania
The town Bystřice nad Pernštejnem (Bistritz ob Pernstein) in the Czech Republic
The town Bystřice pod Hostýnem (Bistritz am Hostein) in the Czech Republic
The town Bystřice (Benešov District) (Bistritz) in the Czech Republic
The municipality and village Bystřice (Frýdek-Místek District) (Bistritz) in the Czech Republic
The municipality and village Bystřice pod Lopeníkem (Bistritz unterm Lopenik) in the Czech Republic

Rivers
Bystřice River, a small Czech river (Bistritz)
Bistriţa River (Siret), river in the Romanian region of Moldavia
Bistrița River (Someș), river in the Romanian region of Transylvania

See also
Bystřice (disambiguation) (Czech)
Bystrzyca (disambiguation) (Polish)
Bystrica (disambiguation) (Slovak)
Bistrica (disambiguation) (Slovene)
Bistritsa (disambiguation) (Бистрица, Bulgarian)
Bistrița (disambiguation) (Romanian)
Beszterce (disambiguation) (Hungarian)
Feistritz (disambiguation) (Austrianised form)